Stony Creek National Forest was established in California on February 6, 1907 with  of land. On July 1, 1908, the name was discontinued after a portion of the forest was used to establish the California National Forest, and the remainder was transferred to Trinity National Forest.

References

External links
Forest History Society
Forest History Society:Listing of the National Forests of the United States Text from Davis, Richard C., ed. Encyclopedia of American Forest and Conservation History. New York: Macmillan Publishing Company for the Forest History Society, 1983. Vol. II, pp. 743–788.

Former National Forests of California